Tiktak, also known as Tik N' Tak, was a Finnish music group consisting of six musicians from northern Helsinki. The band was formed in Pohjois-Helsingin Bändikoulu (Northern Helsinki Band School) and signed to Universal Music in 1999, when the youngest members were 13. Their debut album, Friends, included songs written by Maki Kolehmainen (of Aikakone) and was a huge hit in Finland, with unusually strong sales in the rest of Europe, especially Scandinavia. The band's music was a blend of rock and pop. Each of the girls played their own instruments with the exception of Petra who was the lead singer.

The band gained great domestic popularity. Their first two albums each sold about 100,000 copies.

The band was also marketed in the US where it was called Tik N' Tak. In 2000, they were on the Radio Disney tour and in early 2001 they opened for Aaron Carter. Friends was released on MCA Records.

Guitarist and vocalist Emilia "Emppu" Suhonen is also the vocalist for Dame, whose first album, So Was It Worth Dying For, was released in June 2006.

Their fifth album Ympyrää features the title cut Ympyrää, written by Los Angeles songwriter Gordon Pogoda.

The band decided to break up in 2007 with the last performance in December 2007.

In the summer of 2018 the band came back together and played on four festivals in Finland.

Finnish girl groups

Band members
 Petra Gargano (lead vocals)
 Mirjami "Mimmu" Hyvönen (bass, vocals)
 Nea Mokkila (keyboards)
 Noora Puhakka (guitar, vocals)
 Emilia "Emppu" Suhonen (guitar, vocals)
 Tuuli Taimi (drums, vocals)

Albums

Singles

See also
 List of best-selling music artists in Finland

References

External links
 Official homepage (in Finnish)

Musical groups established in 1999
Musical groups disestablished in 2007
Finnish musical groups
All-female bands
1999 establishments in Finland